Carla Marangoni, better known as Clara Marangoni (13 November 1915 – 18 January 2018), was an Italian gymnast who competed in the 1928 Summer Olympics. She was born in Pavia as "Carla," but she is usually (mistakenly) mentioned in the official statistics as Clara. In 1928, she won the silver medal as member of the Italian gymnastics team and was therefore among the first Italian women to win an Olympic medal.  She was also the last surviving athlete from 1928 Summer Games. Marangoni died on 18 January 2018 at the age of 102 years. She was the 6th and last youngest medalist from the Olympic Games (12 years and 270 days) until the silver medal in skateboarding from the Brazilian Rayssa Leal in 2021 (13 years and 203 days).

See also
 List of centenarians (sportspeople)

References

External links
Clara Marangoni's profile at databaseOlympics
Clara Marangoni's profile at Sports Reference.com

1915 births
2018 deaths
Gymnasts at the 1928 Summer Olympics
Italian centenarians
Italian female artistic gymnasts
Medalists at the 1928 Summer Olympics
Olympic gymnasts of Italy
Olympic medalists in gymnastics
Olympic silver medalists for Italy
Sportspeople from Pavia
Women centenarians